Christos Stergioglou (born 1952) is a Greek actor. He won the award for Best Actor at the 2002 Thessaloniki International Film Festival. He has appeared in more than 20 films since 1981. He currently stars in the Channel 4 sitcom Stath Lets Flats.

Selected filmography
 Think It Over (2002)
 Dogtooth (2009)
 Unfair World (2011)
 The Eternal Return of Antonis Paraskevas (2013)
 September (2013)
 Stath Lets Flats (2018present)

References

External links

1952 births
Living people
Greek male film actors
People from Didymoteicho